Caribou Tuya is a basaltic subglacial mound in far northwestern British Columbia that began eruptive activity under glacial ice during the Fraser glaciation (25 to 10 ka). Like Ash Mountain and South Tuya, sections of the subglacial mound reveal a consistent stratigraphic progression from pillow lavas to hyaloclastite deposits from the base upward. Locally the sections are capped by subaerial basaltic lava flows. Samples of the glassy pillow basalts and hyaloclastites along with crystalline basalt flows were collected at Caribou Tuya. The volcano is believed to have formed and last erupted during the Pleistocene Epoch.

See also
List of volcanoes in Canada
List of Northern Cordilleran volcanoes
Volcanism of Canada
Volcanism of Western Canada
Volcanic history of the Northern Cordilleran Volcanic Province

References

Cassiar Country
One-thousanders of British Columbia
Volcanoes of British Columbia
Subglacial mounds of Canada
Northern Cordilleran Volcanic Province
Stikine Ranges
Pleistocene volcanoes
Monogenetic volcanoes